Singhtarua Football Club is a Thai football club based in Bangkok. The club was founded in 1967 and has competed in the Thai football league system since and was a founding member of the TPL in 1996. They have competed in the Asian Club Championship on two occasions under the name of Port Authority of Thailand and in 2010 they entered the AFC Cup for the first time.

Asian Club Championship

1986-87 Asian Club Championship

1991-92 Asian Club Championship

Group A

AFC Cup

2010 AFC Cup

Group stage

Overall record

By competition

By country

References

Asia